Tott or Thott is the name of a prominent Swedish noble family, whose members occupied many important positions in Sweden and Denmark.

Notable members 
 Åke Henriksson Tott or Achatius Tott (1598–1640), Swedish soldier and politician
 Bridget Tott or Birgitte Thott (1610–1662), Danish translator, writer and feminist
 Brita Tott (fl. 1498), Danish and Swedish noble, landowner, royal county administrator, spy and forger
 Clara Tott (1440–1520), court singer
 Clas Åkesson Tott (c. 1530 – 1590), military field marshal and member of the Privy Council of Sweden
 Erik Axelsson Tott (c. 1419 – 1481), Dano-Swedish statesman and regent of Sweden
 François Baron de Tott (1733–1793), aristocrat
 Hanne Tott (1771–1826), Danish circus artist and circus manager
 Ingeborg Tott (1440s–1507), Swedish noble, the consort of Sten Sture the elder